Billy Deakin (19 January 1925 – August 2018) was a footballer who played as a winger in the Football League for Barnsley and Chester.

References

1925 births
2018 deaths
Chester City F.C. players
Barnsley F.C. players
Corby Town F.C. players
Association football wingers
English Football League players
People from Maltby, South Yorkshire
English footballers